Taiwan Air Cargo Terminal Limited (TACTL) is the leading air cargo terminal operator in Taiwan. Located at the Taoyuan International Airport, it handles over 45% of Taoyuan International Airport's air cargo throughput.

History
TACTL was founded in December 1999, in Taiwan. It started air cargo logistics operations at Taoyuan International Airport in 2000.

Shareholders
TACTL is jointly owned by the following shareholders.
China Airlines Group: 54%
UPS Airlines: 8%
Other Companies: 38%

See also

China Airlines Group
China Airlines
Taoyuan International Airport

References

External links
Taiwan Air Cargo Terminals Limited

China Airlines Group
Transport companies established in 1999
Companies based in Taipei
Taiwanese companies established in 1999